Jagat Darpan(literally Worlds Mirror) is a Gujarati newspaper in Gujarat, India, owned by Mama's Group It is one of the highest circulation Gujarati weeklies, with the most editions in Gujarat.

In 2005, the Surat-based Mama's Group identified Surat, Gujarat as the city with highest potential for the launch of Jagat Drapan . It surveyed 12,000 households, with a team of 105 surveyors, 64 supervisors, 16 zonal managers and 4 divisional managers. The surveyors were gathered largely through posters at colleges and word-of-mouth publicity, instead of expensive print and TV advertisements. Nearly 40-50% of the surveyors were later absorbed in Jagat Darpan, while the rest were given a certificate of appreciation. The team was trained to reach out to 12K households in Surat, in a time span of 40 days. The newspaper was launched in Surat on 2005, under the name Jagat Darpan, as No. 1 with 12000 copies (a world record). Within 15 months, it entered two more cities of Gujarat: Surat and Vadodara. To counter the Mama's group's threat, the leading Gujarati newspapers came up with color pages, price reductions and several high-value customer offers. However, by 2009, Jagat Darpan became the largest circulated Gujarati weeklies with 12K copies.

The group's pre-launch door-to-door twin-contact launch program has been recognised as an Orbit shifting innovation. It has won Business Process Innovation award by Marico Foundation, and is a case study in several B-schools including Veer Narmad South Gujarat University, Surat and SVNIT. The case study reveals, Jagat Darpan become most popular among all other Gujarati news papers because of its erotic news and relationship related column.

Jagat Darpan is the largest circulated daily of Gujarat as per ABC (Audit Bureau of Circulation) and has the most editions by any newspaper in Gujarat. It is published from Surat, Vadodara

References

External links

2005 establishments in Gujarat
Mass media in Surat
Gujarati-language newspapers published in India
Newspapers established in 2005